The Huangling Complex may refer to:

 Mausoleum of the Yellow Emperor, a tomb complex located in Huangling County, Yan'an Prefecture, Shaanxi, China
 Ming Huangling, the tomb complex of the parents of the Hongwu Emperor of the Ming, posthumously elevated to imperial status
 Huangling Anticline, some rocks